The Jeff Peterson Memorial Cup was an annual professional wrestling memorial show produced by Full Impact Pro (FIP) promotion, typically between October and December. The event was established to honor the memory of independent wrestler "All American" Jeff Peterson who died at age 21 after a two-year battle with leukemia. A rising star in the National Wrestling Alliance at the time of his death, his home promotion NWA Florida held a memorial tournament, co-hosted by IPW Hardcore, presented by his friends and fellow Florida wrestlers. The first show was held on May 16–17, 2003, at the Florida WrestlePlex in St. Petersburg, Florida. It is the longest-running tournament in the Southeastern United States followed by CWF Mid-Atlantic's Johnny Weaver Memorial Tournament.

It was a standard 16-man single-elimination tournament intended to showcase the top junior heavyweight wrestlers from independent promotions throughout the United States and Japan. Many top "indy" wrestlers have participated in the event
 with former winners including Reckless Youth (2003), Justice(2004), Chris Sabin (2005), Milano Collection AT (2006), and Chris Hero (2007), Erick Stevens (2008), Davey Richards (2009), and Sami Callihan (2010). The tournament was originally held by NWA Florida from 2003 to 2005, when it closed, and was continued by Full Impact Pro the following year. Both promotions held a combined 9 Memorial Cup tournaments. The tenth tournament on December 14 and 15, 2012, was billed as the last ever Jeff Peterson Memorial Cup and was an independent internet pay-per-view not officially held by any promotion. No wrestler has ever won the tournament twice, but multiple wrestlers have participated in the event more than once.

The event has also featured other wrestling personalities. The 2007 and 2008 editions were hosted by Lenny Leonard and Scott Hudson, former commentators for Ring of Honor and World Championship Wrestling respectively. In 2009, "Outlaw" Ron Bass came out of retirement to wrestle Sean Davis (with Amy Vitale and Phil Davis) in a Texas Bullrope match. Gabe Sapolsky claimed that he used the 2009 tournament to scout talent prior to starting EVOLVE two months later. The following year, five champions took part in the 2010 Jeff Peterson Memorial Cup; FIP World Heavyweight Champion Jon Moxley, FIP Florida Heritage Champion Jake Manning, NWA World Junior Heavyweight Champion Craig Classic, PWR Heavyweight Champion Bruce Santee, and PWR Tag Team Champion Milo Beasley. Aaron Epic, Peterson's last opponent before his death, also competed in the 2011 tournament. It was his first appearance with the company in several years and, though he was eliminated by Jerrelle Clark in the opening round, he praised the event commenting in a later interview for 411mania.com that "there has not been a lot of things that people remember from Florida wrestling but people always remember JPC and to be part of it was an honor".

Since its beginning in 2003, the Jeff Peterson Memorial Cup has been specifically used to raise money for various charities in the state of Florida. The recipient for the 2008 edition, for example, was a two-year-old child diagnosed with a rare form of cancer while proceeds from the 2009 edition went to St. Petersburg's All Children's Hospital.

Tournament winners

Jeff Peterson Memorial Cup (2003)

Jeff Peterson Memorial Cup, Night 1
May 16, 2003 in St. Petersburg, Florida (Florida WrestlePlex)

Jeff Peterson Memorial Cup, Night 2
May 17, 2003 in St. Petersburg, Florida (Florida WrestlePlex)

Tournament bracket
The tournament took place from May 16–17, 2003. The tournament brackets were:

Pin-Pinfall; Sub-Submission; CO-Countout; DCO-Double countout; DQ-Disqualification; Ref-Referee's decision

Jeff Peterson Memorial Cup (2004)

Jeff Peterson Memorial Cup, Night 1
June 4, 2004 in Brandon, Florida (Brandon Allstars)

Jeff Peterson Memorial Cup, Night 2 (Afternoon)
June 5, 2004 in St. Petersburg, Florida (National Guard Armory)

Jeff Peterson Memorial Cup, Night 2 (Evening)
June 5, 2004 in St. Petersburg, Florida (National Guard Armory)

Tournament brackets
The tournament took place from June 4–5, 2004. The tournament brackets were:

Pin-Pinfall; Sub-Submission; CO-Countout; DCO-Double countout; DQ-Disqualification; Ref-Referee's decision

Finals

1.  A fourth semi-final match was held between Teddy Hart and Mikey Tenderfoot, which Hart won. He suffered a knee injury during the bout, however, and was forced to leave the tournament. Chris Hero had also received a bye for his semi-final match against Homicide and officials ordered the tournament to be decided among the three remaining participants in a final three-way elimination match.

Jeff Peterson Memorial Cup (2005)

Jeff Peterson Memorial Cup, Night 1
June 10, 2005 in Brandon, Florida (Brandon All Stars)

Jeff Peterson Memorial Cup, Night 2
June 11, 2005 in Brandon, Florida (Brandon All Stars)

Tournament bracket
The tournament took place from June 10–11, 2005. The tournament brackets were:

Pin-Pinfall; Sub-Submission; CO-Countout; DCO-Double countout; DQ-Disqualification; Ref-Referee's decision

Jeff Peterson Memorial Cup (2006)

Jeff Peterson Memorial Cup, Night 1
June 16, 2006 in Sanford, Florida (Sanford Civic Center)

Jeff Peterson Memorial Cup, Night 2
June 17, 2006 in Pinellas Park, Florida (The Boys and Girls Club)

Tournament bracket
The tournament took place from June 16–17, 2006. The tournament brackets were:

Pin-Pinfall; Sub-Submission; CO-Countout; DCO-Double countout; DQ-Disqualification; Ref-Referee's decision

1.  Reckless Youth had to leave the event for unspecified reasons. Instead of his opponent receiving a bye to the semi-finals, a six-way match was held among the already eliminated participants to replace Youth in the tournament which was won by TJ Wilson.

Jeff Peterson Memorial Cup (2007)

Jeff Peterson Memorial Cup, Night 1
July 13, 2007 in Orlando, Florida (Downtown Orlando Recreation Center)

Jeff Peterson Memorial Cup, Night 2
July 14, 2007 in Port Richey, Florida (Jewish Community Center)

Tournament bracket
The tournament took place from July 13–14, 2007. The tournament brackets were:

Pin-Pinfall; Sub-Submission; CO-Countout; DCO-Double countout; DQ-Disqualification; Ref-Referee's decision

Jeff Peterson Memorial Cup (2008)

Jeff Peterson Memorial Cup, Night 1
September 26, 2008 in Port Richey, Florida (New Lakes in Regency Park Civic Center)

Jeff Peterson Memorial Cup, Night 2
September 27, 2008 in Brooksville, Florida (National Guard Armory)

Tournament bracket
The tournament took place from September 26–27, 2008. The tournament brackets were:

Pin-Pinfall; Sub-Submission; CO-Countout; DCO-Double countout; DQ-Disqualification; Ref-Referee's decision

Jeff Peterson Memorial Cup (2009)

Jeff Peterson Memorial Cup, Night 1
November 20, 2009 in Brooksville, Florida (National Guard Armory)

Jeff Peterson Memorial Cup, Night 2
November 21, 2009 in Crystal River, Florida (National Guard Armory)

Tournament bracket
The tournament took place from November 20–21, 2009. The tournament brackets were:

Pin-Pinfall; Sub-Submission; CO-Countout; DCO-Double countout; DQ-Disqualification; Ref-Referee's decision

Jeff Peterson Memorial Cup (2010)

Jeff Peterson Memorial Cup, Night 1
December 3, 2010 in Brooksville, Florida (National Guard Armory)

Jeff Peterson Memorial Cup, Night 2
December 4, 2010 in Crystal River, Florida (National Guard Armory)

Tournament bracket
The tournament took place from December 3–4, 2010. The tournament brackets were:

Pin-Pinfall; Sub-Submission; CO-Countout; DCO-Double countout; DQ-Disqualification; Ref-Referee's decision

Jeff Peterson Memorial Cup (2011)

Jeff Peterson Memorial Cup, Night 1
October 28, 2011 in Brooksville, Florida (National Guard Armory): Ring Announcer- Sean LaFlash

Jeff Peterson Memorial Cup, Night 2
October 29, 2011 in Crystal River, Florida (National Guard Armory): Ring Announcer- Sean LaFlash

Tournament bracket
The tournament took place on October 28–29, 2011. The tournament brackets were:

Pin-Pinfall; Sub-Submission; CO-Countout; DCO-Double countout; DQ-Disqualification; Ref-Referee's decision

1.  Lince Dorado had to leave the event due to a family emergency. Instead of his opponent receiving a bye to the semi-finals, a six-way match was held among the already eliminated participants to replace Dorado in the tournament, which was won by Jonathan Gresham.

Jeff Peterson Memorial Cup (2012)

Jeff Peterson Memorial Cup, Night 1
December 14, 2012 in Ybor City, Tampa, Florida

Jeff Peterson Memorial Cup, Night 2
December 15, 2012 in Ybor City, Tampa, Florida

Tournament bracket
The tournament took place on December 14–15, 2012. The tournament brackets were:

Pin-Pinfall; Sub-Submission; CO-Countout; DCO-Double countout; DQ-Disqualification; Ref-Referee's decision

References

Notes

Further reading

External links
Jeff Peterson Memorial Cup on Myspace 
JPC2009.com
JPC2008.com
2004 Jeff Peterson Memorial Cup at NWA Florida.com

Professional wrestling memorial shows
Professional wrestling tournaments
Professional wrestling in Florida
2003 in professional wrestling
2004 in professional wrestling
2005 in professional wrestling
2006 in professional wrestling
2007 in professional wrestling
2008 in professional wrestling
2009 in professional wrestling
2010 in professional wrestling
2011 in professional wrestling
2003 establishments in Florida
2011 disestablishments in Florida